Silylene is a chemical compound with the formula SiH2.  It is the silicon analog of methylene, the simplest carbene. Silylene is a stable molecule as a gas but rapidly reacts in a bimolecular manner when condensed. Unlike carbenes, which can exist in the singlet or triplet state, silylene (and all of its derivatives) are singlets.

Silylenes are formal derivatives of silylene with its hydrogens replaced by other substituents. Most examples feature amido (NR2) or alkyl/aryl groups.
Silylenes have been proposed as reactive intermediates. They are carbene analogs.

Synthesis and properties
Silylenes are generally synthesized by thermolysis or photolysis of polysilanes, by silicon atom reactions (insertion, addition or abstraction), by pyrolysis of silanes, or by reduction of 1,1-dihalosilane.  It has long been assumed that the conversion of metallic Si to tetravalent silicon compounds proceeds via silylene intermediates:
Si + Cl2 → SiCl2
SiCl2 + Cl2 → SiCl4
Similar considerations apply to the direct process, the reaction of methyl chloride and bulk silicon.

Early observations of silylenes involved generation of dimethylsilylene by dechlorination of dimethyldichlorosilane:
SiCl2(CH3)2 + 2 K → Si(CH3)2 + 2 KCl
The formation of dimethylsilylene was demonstrated by conducting the dechlorination in the presence of trimethylsilane, the trapped product being pentamethyldisilane:
Si(CH3)2 + HSi(CH3)3 → (CH3)2Si(H)−Si(CH3)3

The α-amido centers stabilize silylenes by π-donation. The dehalogenation of diorganosilicon dihalides is a widely exploited.

Related reactions
In one study diphenylsilylene is generated by flash photolysis of a trisilane:

In this reaction diphenylsilylene is extruded from the trisila ring. The silylene can be observed with UV spectroscopy at 520 nm and is short-lived with a chemical half-life of two microseconds.

See also
Carbene analogs
N-heterocyclic silylene
Silenes, R2Si=SiR2
Silylium ions, protonated silylenes

References

Inorganic silicon compounds
Free radicals